Shenton is a village in Leicestershire.

Shenton may also refer to:

Shenton (surname)  includes list of people bearing the name

Places

Australia
 Shenton Avenue, road in Perth
 Shenton College, college in Perth
 Shenton House, building in University of Western Australia
 Shenton Park, Western Australia, suburb of Perth

Singapore
 8 Shenton Way, skyscraper
 One Shenton Way, skyscraper
 Shenton Way, road
 Shenton Way MRT station, Mass Rapid Transit station

See also

 Old Mill, Perth, aka Shenton's Mill